Second Law Committee (2 LU), was a committee in the Swedish Riksdag during the bicameral period of Sweden. The committee's areas of responsibility of the Second Law Committee concern, policies, and questions on legislation on social issues.

The committee was defunct at the abolition of the bicameral Riksdag in 1971 along with the First Law Committee, and the Third Law Committee.

Sources

Books 

Defunct standing committees of the Riksdag